The following is the list of Film Studios located in Hyderabad, India.

References

Hyderabad, India-related lists
Indian film-related lists
 Hyderabad
Film production companies based in Hyderabad, India